P. L. Samy was an Indian civil servant and administrator. He was the administrator of Mahe from  6 June 1967 to 3 June 1969.

References 

 

Year of birth missing
Possibly living people
Administrators of Mahe